Miss Bicolandia is an annual regional beauty pageant that is run by the Naga City Government. It is the oldest running beauty pageant in Bicol Region, Philippines. It is held during the Peñafrancia Festival in September in Naga.

Titleholders

References

Beauty pageants in the Philippines
Culture of Camarines Sur
Philippine awards